ISO 3166-2:AL is the entry for Albania in ISO 3166-2, part of the ISO 3166 standard published by the International Organization for Standardization (ISO), which defines codes for the names of the principal subdivisions (e.g., provinces or states) of all countries coded in ISO 3166-1.

Currently for Albania, ISO 3166-2 codes are defined for 12 counties.

Each code consists of two parts, separated by a hyphen. The second part is two digits.

The codes for the counties are assigned in Albanian alphabetical order, except Dibër, whose code is assigned based on its capital, Peshkopi.

Current codes
Subdivision names are listed as in the ISO 3166-2 standard published by the ISO 3166 Maintenance Agency .

Subdivision names are sorted in Albanian alphabetical order: a-c, ç, d, dh, e, ë, f-g, gj, h-l, ll, m-n, nj, o-r, rr, s, sh, t, th, u-x, xh, y-z, zh.

Click on the button in the header to sort each column.

Changes
The following changes to the entry have been announced in newsletters by the ISO 3166/MA since the first publication of ISO 3166-2 in 1998. ISO stopped issuing newsletters in 2013.

The following changes to the entry are listed on ISO's online catalogue, the Online Browsing Platform:

District codes 
Before 27 November 2015, codes for the 36 districts of Albania were included.  The code for Kolonjë was assigned based on its capital, Ersekë.

See also
 Subdivisions of Albania
 FIPS region codes of Albania

External links
 ISO Online Browsing Platform: AL
 Counties of Albania, Statoids.com

2:AL
 
ISO 3166-2
Albania geography-related lists